The University of California High-Performance AstroComputing Center (UC-HiPACC), based at the University of California at Santa Cruz (UCSC), is a consortium of nine University of California campuses and three Department of Energy laboratories (Lawrence Berkeley National Laboratory, Lawrence Livermore Laboratory, and Los Alamos National Laboratory). The consortium's goal is to support and facilitate original research and education in computational astrophysics, and to engage in public outreach and education.

Staff and organization 

Joel R. Primack, distinguished Professor of Physics at UCSC, has directed the UC-HiPACC consortium since its inception.
The staff includes Senior Writer Trudy E. Bell, Administrator Sue Grasso, Scientific Visualization Coordinator Alex Bogert, and webmaster Steve Zaslaw. The consortium is organized at UCSC under the aegis of the Santa Cruz Institute for Particle Physics (SCIPP).

Principal activities 

The UC-HiPACC consortium, which began operating  in January 2010, supports activities to facilitate and encourage excellence, collaboration, and education in astronomy across the University of California system and affiliated DOE National Laboratories. It does not directly fund research or major hardware. Instead, UC-HiPACC sponsors working groups of UC scientists from multiple campuses and labs pursuing joint projects in computational astrophysics; workshops and conferences on topics in computational astrophysics; and an annual advanced summer school on a topic in computational astrophysics.

UC-HiPACC Meetings and Summer Schools 2010 – 2013 

Fourteen multi-day meetings and International Summer Schools on AstroComputing (ISSAC) were held from 2010 to 2013.

AGORA = Assembling Galaxies of Resolved Anatomy; CAS = California Academy of Sciences; CGE = Center for Galaxy Evolution; ISSAC = International Summer School on AstroComputing; LBNL = Lawrence Berkeley National Laboratory; NASA = NASA Ames Research Center; NSF = National Science Foundation; SDSC = San Diego Supercomputer Center; UCI = UC Irvine; UCSC = UC Santa Cruz. All participants in the journalism boot camp were professional science journalists.

Future of AstroComputing Workshop (2010) 

In December 2010 UC-HiPACC organized a major conference on the Future of AstroComputing at the San Diego Supercomputer Center at the University of California, San Diego (SDSC). UC-HiPACC provided partial support for the Enzo workshop at UCSD in spring 2010.

2012 Science Journalism Boot Camp in Computational Astronomy 

It organized a journalism “boot camp” on computational astronomy, called “Computational Astronomy: From Planets to Cosmos”.

Santa Cruz Galaxy Workshops 

Five-day workshops for galaxy researchers worldwide co-sponsored by UC-HiPACC were held at UCSC in August 2010, 2011, 2012, and 2013.

Cosmological simulations 

Large cosmological simulations are now the basis for much current research on the structure of the universe and the evolution of galaxies and clusters of galaxies. “Numerical simulations have become one of the most effective tools to study and to solve astrophysical problems.”

Project AGORA 
In 2012, the center launched a galaxy supercomputer simulation project called AGORA (Assembling Galaxies of Resolved Anatomy).

Bolshoi Simulation 

The  Bolshoi Cosmological Simulation (q.v.) is the most accurate cosmological simulation of the evolution of the large-scale structure of the universe made to date.

Education of public and other outreach 

Planetarium shows for which UC-HiPACC members have contributed astronomical computations and images include “Life: A Cosmic Story” in the 75-foot dome of the Morrison Planetarium in San Francisco, and “Deep Space Adventure” in the 71-foot 8000 pixel-across dome of the Adler Planetarium in Chicago.

A visualization from the Bolshoi Cosmological Simulation was narrated in the National Geographic TV special Inside the Milky Way. UC-HiPACC  provided footage from the Bolshoi Simulation to the Icelandic performer Björk for her musical number “Dark Matter” for her Biophilia concert.

References

External links 
 

Astronomy institutes and departments
University of California, Santa Cruz
Supercomputer sites